Defending champion Justine Henin defeated Amélie Mauresmo in the final, 7–5, 6–7(4–7), 7–6(7–2) to win the singles tennis title at the 2007 Eastbourne International.

Seeds
A champion seed is indicated in bold text while text in italics indicates the round in which that seed was eliminated. The top four seeds received a bye to the second round.

Draw

Final

Section 1

Section 2

External links
 2007 Hastings Direct International Championships Draw

Singles
Hastings Direct International Championships